Saint-Laurent-de-la-Prée is a French commune and town in the Charente-Maritime department, administrative region of Nouvelle-Aquitaine.

Population

See also
Communes of the Charente-Maritime department

References

Communes of Charente-Maritime
Charente-Maritime communes articles needing translation from French Wikipedia